The Worshipful Company of Gunmakers is one of the 110 livery companies of the City of London.

The Gunmakers' Company received a royal charter of incorporation in 1637. The Proof House has statutory duties to regulate the safety of firearms in the United Kingdom. To administer proof, the company was given broad powers of 'search, gage, proof, trial and mark'. The power to search (with a constable) for unproved guns and seize them is still vested in the company today.

However, the major three activities of the Proof House are: proof, safety and de-activation.

Proof is the process of testing the safety of a gun barrel. It is still done as it has been since the company was established in 1637: by test-firing the gun with an over-pressure charge of powder. If the gun survives undamaged, it will be safe to shoot. If it doesn’t, it is deemed unfit for sale – and kept from the hands of the public. Although modern non-destructive inspection techniques enable the examination of the internal structure of metal to a high degree of accuracy, there is still no better way of determining which weaknesses and imperfections might prove dangerous to the user. 

The Gun Barrel Proof Acts specify the rules under which proof is carried out.

Unlike many livery companies, the Gunmakers have retained an active link to their trade and consults with the government on related firearms regulation.

The testing technique involves test-firing a gun barrel, or the barrel and action using specially manufactured and controlled proof ammunition, that develops in the order of 125% of the normal service pressure intended for the gun in question. The gun is securely held in a special carriage fixture within a dedicated proof chamber and fired remotely . The barrel, or barrel and action are then inspected. 

If they have maintained structural integrity, they will be stamped with  proof marks indicating  the test pressure, bore diameter in millimetres at 9" from the breech face, chamber length, suitability for use with steel shot or not in the case of a smoothbore shotgun, a date stamp or code and the  mark of the proof house that tested the firearm (London or Birmingham).

The Society of the Mystery of Gunmakers of the City of London is one of only two organisations (the other being the Birmingham Proof House) approved by the Secretary of State for the deactivation and subsequent certification of the deactivation of firearms under section 58(1) Firearms Act 1968.

De-activation of firearms is a process where the gun is altered in such a way as to render them permanently incapable of firing and thus completely safe for collectors. 

The Proof House Committee, which is appointed by the court of the Gunmakers’ Company, is responsible for regulating and executing the proving of small arms in accordance with the company’s charter and the Gun Barrel Proof Acts. The Proof Master, who is appointed by the court, is responsible for the day to day running and operations of the Proof House

Since 1675, the company has been located at the London Proof House on Commercial Road, just east of Aldgate and outside the old City walls. 

It is unique amongst livery companies for being located outside the City Wall.

The Gunmakers' Company ranks seventy-third in the order of precedence of the livery companies.

See also
 Proof test

References

External links
 

Gunmakers
1637 establishments in England